The Dark Crystal is a graphic adventure game based on Jim Henson's 1982 fantasy film, The Dark Crystal. The game was designed by Roberta Williams and published under the SierraVenture line in 1983 as Hi-Res Adventure #6: The Dark Crystal. It is the first Hi-Res Adventure released under the SierraVenture line, the previous games being released under earlier names and later re-released under SierraVenture. An alternative version of the game for younger players called Gelfling Adventure was released in 1984.

Gameplay

The Dark Crystal is set in Thra, a world with three suns. Every thousand years the three suns come together in an event known as "The Great Conjunction". The player controls Jen, a gelfling. Two souls are destined to battle to reveal the secrets of their past. One warrior's fate rests in the hands of a tyrannical villain who is hellbent on destruction.

The game features no music, a single beep is used to alert that no action other than the return key can be taken and a double beep if another command is used at that time.

Development
It took Roberta Williams a little over a month to develop the design for the game, which was then turned over to programmers and artists.

Reception
Softline in 1983 wrote that "In a way, it's better than the movie", stating The Dark Crystal "thin story that failed to serve the movie well is comparatively top-drawer material in the game" and calling the graphics "delightful". The game would go on to receive a Certificate of Merit in the category of "1984 Best Computer Adventure" at the 5th annual Arkie Awards.

References

External links

HI-RES VOL. 1, NO. 3 / MARCH 1984
The Sierra Help Pages
Gamespot
An official free re-creation of the game

1983 video games
Adventure games
Apple II games
Atari 8-bit family games
ScummVM-supported games
Sierra Entertainment games
The Dark Crystal
Video games based on films
Video games set on fictional planets
Video games developed in the United States